Judas of Galilee, or Judas of Gamala, was a Jewish leader who led resistance to the census imposed for Roman tax purposes by Quirinius in Judea Province around 6 CE. He encouraged Jews not to register and those that did had their houses burnt and their cattle stolen by his followers. He is credited with beginning the "fourth philosophy" of the Jews which Josephus blames for the disastrous war with the Romans in 66–70. These events are discussed by Josephus in The Jewish War and in Antiquities of the Jews and mentioned in the Acts of the Apostles.

In Antiquities of the Jews, Josephus states that Judas, along with Zadok the Pharisee, founded the Zealots, the "fourth sect" of 1st century Judaism (the first three being the Sadducees, the Pharisees, and the Essenes). Josephus blamed this fourth sect for the First Jewish–Roman War of 66–73. The Zealots were theocratic nationalists who preached that God alone was the ruler of Israel and urged that no taxes should be paid to Rome.

Several scholars, such as Gunnar Haaland and James S. McLaren, have suggested that Josephus's description of the fourth sect does not reflect historical reality, but was constructed to serve his own interests. According to Haaland, the part covering the Zealots acts as a transition and an introduction to the excursion concerning the Jewish schools of thought, all of which Josephus presents to portray the majority of Jews in a positive light, and to show that the Jewish War was incited by a radical minority. Similarly, McLaren proposes that Judas and his sect act as scapegoats for the war that are chronologically, geographically and socially removed from the priestly circles of Jerusalem (and Josephus himself).

Josephus does not relate the death of Judas, although he does report that Judas' sons James and Simon were executed by procurator Tiberius Julius Alexander in about 46 CE. He also reports that Menahem ben Judah, one of the early leaders of the Jewish Revolt in 66 CE, was Judas' "son", but some scholars doubt this. Menahem may have been Judas' grandson, however. Menahem's cousin, Eleazar ben Ya'ir, then escaped to the fortress of Masada where he became a leader of the last doomed defenders against the Roman Empire.

Judas is referred to in Acts of the Apostles, in which a speech by Gamaliel, a member of the Sanhedrin, identifies Theudas and Judas as examples of failed Messianic movements, and suggests that the movement emerging in the name of Jesus of Nazareth could similarly fail.

See also
Galilean
Gamala
List of biblical figures identified in extra-biblical sources

References

External links
Jewish Encyclopedia: Judas the Galilean

0s in the Roman Empire
1st-century Jews
AD 6
Jewish rebels
Judean people
People in Acts of the Apostles
Religion-based wars
Tax resisters
Year of birth unknown
Census of Quirinius